Lynn Shelton (August 27, 1965 – May 16, 2020) was an American filmmaker, known for writing, directing, and producing such films as Humpday and Your Sister's Sister. She was associated with the mumblecore genre.

Early life
Shelton was born in Oberlin, Ohio, and raised in Seattle, Washington. She described herself as having been audacious as a young girl, but having lost confidence in her creativity in adolescence. This experience contributed to a theme she explored in her 2005 film We Go Way Back.

Shelton attended Garfield High School. After high school, Shelton attended Oberlin College in Ohio and then the University of Washington School of Drama. She then moved to New York and followed the Master's of Fine Arts program in photography and related media at the School of Visual Arts in Manhattan. Her thesis advisor was Peggy Ahwesh.

She began working in the film industry as a film editor and made a series of experimental short films which have been described as "accomplished" and providing the basis for the "subtle, almost anthropological scrutiny" brought to bear in her later works.

Among the jobs she held to support her film career was working aboard a fishing trawler in the Bering Sea.

Film and television career
Shelton had wanted to be a director, but was worried that being in her mid-30s, it was too late to begin. When she saw French director Claire Denis speak at Seattle's Northwest Film Forum in 2003, Denis revealed she was 40 when she directed her first feature film, and that revelation made Shelton realize that she still had plenty of time.

In 2004, Shelton began writing and directing her first feature film, We Go Way Back. Described as "polished" and "impressionistic", the film depicts a 23-year-old actress, Kate, confronted by her 13-year-old self. The dialog between the older and younger Kates begins in memory, and then climaxes in an apparitional experience with the specter of her own, repressed, precocious youth. We Go Way Back premiered at the Slamdance Film Festival in 2006.

In 2008, Shelton's dark comedy My Effortless Brilliance played at South by Southwest and Maryland Film Festival.

Her film Humpday premiered at Sundance, was acquired by Magnolia Pictures, and has been shown at Cannes, SIFF, South by Southwest and other film festivals. It opened in theaters in New York and Seattle on July 10, 2009.

Her film Your Sister's Sister premiered in 2011 at the Toronto International Film Festival. The film starred Emily Blunt, Rosemarie DeWitt, and Mark Duplass. When asked about exploring the relationship between sisters in a 2012 interview with FF2 Media's Jan Lisa Huttner, Shelton said:Everybody has had that experience of going home for Thanksgiving and starting to act ten years old again because they're in the same situation with their parents and their siblings. So you get back into this rut again of who you were when you were first becoming a grownup. It's not until you get out that you can break out of those bonds, but we still get trapped by them when we return.Touchy Feely premiered at Sundance Film Festival in 2013, where it was nominated for the Grand Jury Prize. It starred Rosemarie DeWitt, Allison Janney, and Elliot Page.

Laggies was the first film Shelton directed that she had not also written. The film starred Keira Knightley and Chloë Grace Moretz, and premiered at the 2014 Sundance Film Festival where it was acquired by A24 Films.

In 2015, Shelton was invited to join the Academy of Motion Picture Arts and Sciences' Director's Branch.

In 2017, her film Outside In premiered at Toronto International Film Festival. It starred Jay Duplass, Edie Falco, Kaitlyn Dever, and Ben Schwartz.

Her 2019 comedy Sword of Trust had its world premiere at South by Southwest. In it, Cynthia (Jillian Bell) inherits a sword from her deceased grandfather, which he believed proves the South won the Civil War.

Shelton has directed episodes for TV shows since 2009 including The Good Place, GLOW, New Girl, Mad Men, Casual and, in 2020, the Hulu miniseries Little Fires Everywhere, starring Kerry Washington and Reese Witherspoon.

Shelton described her approach to comedy as doing the opposite:When we were on set, it was really essential that none of us—not the actors or myself either—think that we're in “a comedy,” because that's when I find (especially with improvisation) you start reaching for jokes. You start sort of “soft-shoeing,” and trying to entertain people, and I don’t want that.

I want us to just always be playing to the truth of the scene and I really have no idea how many laughs there are going to be. We're playing it so straight that it's really hard to tell the forest for the trees.

A week prior to her death, Shelton revealed she was in the process of co-writing a dramatic film with Marc Maron.

Influences 
Shelton cited directors Claire Denis, Woody Allen, and Ingmar Bergman as influences.

In a 2020 post made on her Instagram page, Shelton clipped a picture from the movie You Can Count on Me (2000), written and directed by Kenneth Lonergan. The caption she wrote—"I don't know if I could ever make a film as perfect and incredible as this one, but boy oh boy would I like to try"—strongly suggests that the film (and perhaps Lonergan) had a profound influence on her decision to become a filmmaker.

Personal life
Shelton came out as bisexual in 2012. She was married to actor Kevin Seal, with whom she had a son, Milo Seal. Shelton was in a relationship with stand-up comedian Marc Maron at the time of her death.

Death and legacy
Shelton died of acute myeloid leukemia in Los Angeles on May 16, 2020, at age 54, after several days of ill health.

In 2020, Northwest Film Forum and Duplass Brothers Productions launched the Lynn Shelton “Of a Certain Age” Grant. This $25,000 unrestricted cash grant supports a woman or non-binary US-based filmmaker, age 39 or older, who has yet to direct a narrative feature. The grant's details are inspired by Shelton’s own path as a filmmaker.

In August 2020, The American Cinematheque hosted an online tribute event for Shelton, featuring Gillian Jacobs, Kerry Washington, Reese Witherspoon, and more.

Filmography

As film editor
 Outpatient (2002)
 8 Minutes to Love (2004)
 Afternoon Delight (2004)
 Hedda Gabler (2004)
 Hello (2005)
 We Go Way Back (2006)
 Diggers (2007)
 My Effortless Brilliance (2008)

As producer
 My Effortless Brilliance (2008)
 Humpday (2009)

As an actor
 Maron (2016): Sheila

Awards and nominations 

2008 – Genius Award for lifetime achievement from The Stranger newspaper

See also
 List of female film and television directors
 List of LGBT-related films directed by women

References

External links

Lynn Shelton, Hell Is for Hyphenates, September 30, 2014
Marc Maron's tribute to Shelton on WTF

1965 births
2020 deaths
21st-century American actresses
Actresses from Washington (state)
American film actresses
American women film producers
American television actresses
American television directors
American women film directors
American women television directors
Bisexual actresses
Bisexual women
Deaths from acute myeloid leukemia
Deaths from cancer in California
Filmmakers from Seattle
Independent Spirit Award winners
LGBT film directors
American LGBT screenwriters
Oberlin College alumni
University of Washington School of Drama alumni
American women screenwriters
Film directors from Ohio
LGBT people from Ohio
Film directors from Washington (state)
LGBT people from Washington (state)
Screenwriters from Washington (state)
Film producers from Washington (state)
American women film editors
American film editors
Writers from Seattle
American bisexual actors
American bisexual writers